Count  was a Japanese samurai military leader and statesman.   He was a general in the Imperial Japanese Army and an admiral in the Imperial Japanese Navy. He later became the first Japanese Governor-General of Taiwan during the island's period as a Japanese colony. He is also sometimes referred to as Kabayama Motonori.

Biography
Born in Satsuma domain (modern day Kagoshima Prefecture) to a samurai family, Kabayama fought in the Anglo-Satsuma War and the Boshin War.

In 1871, he enlisted in the new Imperial Japanese Army and was accepted with the rank of major due to his previous combat experience. He was one of the defenders of Kumamoto Castle during the Satsuma Rebellion against his former Satsuma countrymen. He was subsequently promoted to colonel, and then major general, and placed in charge of the Tokyo Metropolitan Police.

In 1883, Kabayama changed from the army to the navy, becoming taifu (senior vice minister) of Navy with the rank of rear admiral, and was also ennobled with the title of viscount (koshaku) under the kazoku peerage system. The following year he was promoted to vice admiral.

Kabayama became Vice Navy Minister in 1886. He visited the United States and Europe from 25 September 1887 to 19 October 1888. He then served in several positions before being appointed Navy Minister under the first Yamagata and Matsukata cabinets from 1890 to 1892. Although not a politician, he spoke out harshly against representative democracy and civilian influence on the government in a speech Banyu Enzetsu made during the second Imperial Diet session. He retired in 1892.

During the First Sino-Japanese War, Kabayama was recalled from the reserves and accepted a field command, and was present at the Battle of the Yalu and Battle of Weihaiwei. It states something of his personality to note that he ordered his flagship, the lightly armed passenger liner Saikyo to charge the Chinese fleet at the Battle of the Yalu River.

Kabayama was commander of the Japanese invasion force for Taiwan. On 10 May 1895, he was promoted to full admiral and became the first Japanese Governor-General of Taiwan, being responsible for moving the seat of government to Taipei. He was elevated to hakushaku (Count) on 5 August 1895 and also awarded the Order of the Rising Sun (first class).

Despite his best efforts to stabilize Japan's rule over Taiwan, his 13 months term as Governor-General were not peaceful. From December 1895 to January 1896, uprisings surfaced in many parts of the island, and he was forced to request reinforcements from home. In the ensuing action, 2800 Taiwanese were killed. Kabayama was succeeded by Lieutenant General Katsura Tarō.

After his return to Japan in June 1896, Kabayama subsequently served on the Privy Council, as Home Minister under the 2nd Matsukata Cabinet, and Education Minister under the 2nd Yamagata cabinet.

Kabayama retired again from duty in 1910. His grave is at the Somei Reien Cemetery, in Sugamo, Tokyo.

Notes

References and Further reading

External links
 National Diet Library,  Portraits of Modern Japanese Historical Figures, Kabayama Sukenori

Japanese generals
Imperial Japanese Navy admirals
Ministers of the Imperial Japanese Navy
Governors-General of Taiwan
People from Satsuma Domain
People of the Boshin War
Kazoku
Recipients of the Order of the Rising Sun
Recipients of the Order of the Golden Kite, 2nd class
1837 births
1922 deaths
Japanese military personnel of the First Sino-Japanese War
People of Meiji-period Japan
Shimazu retainers
Ministers of Home Affairs of Japan
People from Kagoshima